Labastide-de-Virac is a commune in the southern French department of Ardèche. It features a fort dating to the 16th century.

Population

See also
 Côtes du Vivarais AOC
Communes of the Ardèche department

References

Communes of Ardèche
Ardèche communes articles needing translation from French Wikipedia
Vivarais